Robert Higford (c. 1530–1572) was an English politician.

He was a Member (MP) of the Parliament of England for Aldeburgh in 1571.

References

1530 births
1572 deaths
English MPs 1571